Ramal de Aveiro-Mar was a  Portuguese railway line, in Aveiro. It connected the metre-gauge Ramal de Aveiro, at Aveiro railway station, to the Canal do Cojo dock, and was used to transport fish to the local market.

It had a bridge over the Linha do Norte, and an underpass towards the end of the line.

See also 
 List of railway lines in Portugal
 List of Portuguese locomotives and railcars
 History of rail transport in Portugal

References

Aveiro-Mar
Metre gauge railways